Buaren  is a mountain on the border between Vestfold and Buskerud, Norway. It is located on both sides of the border between the municipalities of Holmestrand and Kongsberg.

References

Mountains of Vestfold og Telemark
Mountains of Viken